The Theron Mountains are a group of mountains, extending in a NE-SW direction for  and rising , on the eastern side of the Filchner Ice Shelf. They were first seen from the air in 1956 by the Commonwealth Trans-Antarctic Expedition (CTAE) and named for the Theron, the ship of the CTAE in 1955–56.

References

Mountain ranges of Coats Land
Filchner-Ronne Ice Shelf